Duboisvalia is a genus of moths within the family Castniidae. It was described by Oiticica in 1955.

Species
 Duboisvalia cononia (Westwood, 1877)
 Duboisvalia ecuadoria (Westwood, 1877)
 Duboisvalia simulans (Boisduval, [1875])

References

Castniidae